Tachina aurulenta is a species of fly in the genus Tachina of the family Tachinidae that is endemic to China.

References

Insects described in 1987
Diptera of Asia
Endemic fauna of China
aurulenta